Kyukichi, Kyūkichi (久吉) is a Japanese given name and surname. Notable people with the name include:

 Kyukichi Kishida (1888–1968), Japanese zoologist
 Unryū Kyūkichi (1822–1890), Japanese sumo wrestler

Japanese masculine given names